West Pennant Hills is a suburb in the Hills District of Sydney, New South Wales, Australia. West Pennant Hills is located 27 km north-west of the Sydney central business district in the local government areas of The Hills Shire and Hornsby Shire. It is located halfway between Parramatta and Hornsby at the border of the North Shore and Greater Western Sydney. Pennant Hills is a separate suburb to the east with its own postcode.

Commercial area
West Pennant Hills is a residential suburb with a commercial area located at Thompsons Corner, also the site of the suburb's government primary school, West Pennant Hills Public School.

Cherrybrook railway station is located to the north of West Pennant Hills near Castle Hill Road and nearby there is another shopping complex on Coonara Avenue, where a Woolworths, restaurants and several other small shops are located.

History 
Workmen on the railway from Strathfield to Hornsby established a camp and stores depot there in about 1890. During Lachlan Macquarie's governorship (1810–21), a timbersawing establishment stood near today's Thompsons Corner. In those early days the pit-sawyers roamed the countryside, and the saw pits were set up at various places close to forest areas. In the early 1990s, one of the last mills was demolished, having stood at the bottom of Hill Road.

The suburb was named for both its geological features and its man-made additions. When Sydney was first established, 'Pennant Hills', applied to the range of hills stretching north from Parramatta. The Pennant refers to a flag pole erected on the area's highest point. During the first years of the Sydney settlement this flag pole with its pennant was a form of early communication between the government in Parramatta and the governor's outer Sydney residence. It was used to signal to Parramatta that the governor was returning to Parramatta after spending time at his retreat in the outer areas of Sydney. When his horse-drawn carriage went past Thompsons Corner, the pennant would be raised and as this was in clear sight of the Parramatta garrison, they would prepare for his return in a few days. Local stories twist this system to say that when the pennant was raised the soldiers would have to stop drinking and clean up the streets after running amok in his absence.

In 1850, at a time when the combined population of Field of Mars Common and Castle Hill numbered fewer than 3,000 people, Henry Parkes approved, on behalf of the Board of National Education in New South Wales, the appointment of local patrons for the commencement of Pennant Hills Public School. Botany, Fort Street, Smithfield and Pennant Hills were the first metropolitan schools under the control of the newly constituted Board. The school first opened under the name of Pennant Hills Public School when the township of Pennant Hills was centred on the ridge at the intersection of Pennant Hills and Castle Hill Roads, which was a trading point on the way north. When the railway station line came through the area, a new school was built in 1925 closer to the railway station, to be known as 'Pennant Hills East'. West was added to the name of the original school and it became 'Pennant Hills West' and eventually the area around Thompsons Corner became known as West Pennant Hills.

Pennant Hills Post Office opened on 1 January 1867 and was renamed West Pennant Hills on 1 August 1898, due to the Pennant Hills Railway Station office (opened two months earlier) being given the name Pennant Hills.

West Pennant Hills was split off from Pennant Hills as a separate suburb on 23 August 1986.

Parks and recreation
Tourist attractions include the Cumberland State Forest and the Koala Park Sanctuary.

Population
Of these: 
 The median age was 41 years. Children aged 0–14 years made up 18.5% of the population and people aged 65 years and over made up 15.4% of the population.
 59.7% of people were born in Australia. The most common countries of birth were China 6.7%, India 3.6%, Hong Kong 3.5%, England 3.5% and Sri Lanka 1.9%.
  63.0% of people only spoke English at home. Other languages spoken at home included Mandarin 8.5%, Cantonese 7.4%, Korean 2.2%, Hindi 2.2% and Arabic 1.4%.
 The most common responses for religion were Catholic 25.0%, No Religion 24.2% and Anglican 15.8%.

Notable people
Len Beadell - explorer
Dominic Perrottet - Premier of New South Wales
Damien Tudehope - politician

References

External links 
  
  

Suburbs of Sydney
The Hills Shire
Hornsby Shire
Populated places established in 1796